Lioness Records is a British record label, founded in 2009 by British singer Amy Winehouse. Winehouse stated she was inspired by Berry Gordy's Motown Records, and The Specials' 2 Tone Records to create her own label.

Formation
Lioness Records was formed in 2009, due to Winehouse's wish of signing Dionne Bromfield. Winehouse stated that "the first time I heard Dionne sing, I couldn't believe what I was hearing, such an amazing voice from such a young cat. She’s so much better than I was at her age. I'm just so proud of her". The name Lioness Records comes from a necklace, given to Winehouse from her grandmother, Cynthia, bearing a pendant featuring a lioness. Winehouse died in 2011, although her father, Mitchell Winehouse, has remained an active director.

Roster

Release history

Albums

Singles

2010s

2000s

References

Record labels established in 2009
British record labels
Amy Winehouse